Henri William Joseph Verhavert (8 September 1874 – 9 August 1955) was a Belgian army officer and gymnast who competed in the 1920 Summer Olympics. In 1920 he won the bronze medal as member of the Belgian gymnastics team in the Swedish system event. He served in the Belgian Army from 1894 until 1936, retiring with the rank of lieutenant general, and was briefly recalled in 1940.

References

Sources

1874 births
1955 deaths
Belgian male artistic gymnasts
Gymnasts at the 1920 Summer Olympics
Olympic gymnasts of Belgium
Olympic bronze medalists for Belgium
Olympic medalists in gymnastics
Medalists at the 1920 Summer Olympics